Jeff Wagner may refer to:

 A member of the band The Postmarks
 Jeff Wagner (politician), member of the Ohio House of Representatives
 Jeff Wagner, writer, former co-editor of Metal Maniacs